Mobarakabad (also Romanized as Mobārakābād) is a village in Qanavat Rural District, in the Central District of Qom County, Qom Province, Iran. At the 2006 census, its population was 628, in 147 families.

References 

Populated places in Qom Province